Nesiotrechus is a genus of beetles in the family Carabidae, containing the following species:

 Nesiotrechus convexiusculus (Ueno, 1975)
 Nesiotrechus dahongensis Deuve, 2005

References

Trechinae